Leonard Chalmers (formerly Lillian Florence Elizabeth Chalmers; 5 December 1911 – 24 February 1990) was an English athlete who competed in the 1934 British Empire Games. At the 1934 Empire Games he won the bronze medal in the 100 yards event. He also competed in the 1938 European Championships in Athletics held in Vienna and finished sixth in the 200 metre event.

Chalmers was also entered into the 4x100 relay at the 1936 Berlin Games but did not compete, as well as becoming a three-time champion at the Women's AAA Championships, winning the 200 meters in 1937 and 1939 and the 400 meters in 1939. He finally raced in the 1939 ISTAF Berlin meeting at Berlin Stadium, only a few weeks before World War II started.

Chalmers worked as a machinist in a cardboard box factory before his athletic career, and was the youngest of five children. His eldest sibling died during the Gallipoli Campaign during World War I.

Chalmers lived in the Rudmore district of Portsmouth before World War II, but later moved to live near London Heathrow Airport. Around 1961, Chalmers underwent gender reassignment as a trans man, going by the name Leonard Chalmers. He died from the effects of a stroke in early 1990 at the age of 78.

References

External links
Profile at TOPS in athletics

1911 births
1990 deaths
English female sprinters
Athletes (track and field) at the 1934 British Empire Games
Commonwealth Games bronze medallists for England
Commonwealth Games medallists in athletics
Transgender sportsmen
Medallists at the 1934 British Empire Games

Transgender men